Rangsit University (Thai: มหาวิทยาลัยรังสิต) (RSU) is a private university in Pathum Thani, Thailand, focusing mainly on music, design, Information technology, and public health including independent professions.

RSU is fully accredited by the Thai government's Commission on Higher Education of the Ministry of Education. The main campus occupies a  site in the Lak-Hok sub-district of Mueang Pathum Thani District, Pathum Thani Province. Rangsit University is the only private university assessed for quality by the Office for National Education Standards and Quality Assessment that is rated "very good" among institutions focused on graduate education.

Colleges and Faculties
 RSU offers 141 programs: 94 undergraduate programs, 37 master's degree programs, one graduate diploma, and nine doctoral degree programs.

(*includes graduate schools.)

Colleges
College of Medicine
 College of Oriental Medicine*
 College of Biomedical Engineering*
 College of Engineering*
 College of Government *
 College of Social Innovation*
 College of Information Technology*
 Conservatory of Music*
 College of International*
 College of Communication Arts*
 College of Tourism and Hospitality*
 College of Agricultural innovation, Biotechnology and Food
 Aviation Institute

Faculties
 Faculty of Dentistry
 Faculty of Nursing Science
 Faculty of Pharmacy*
 Faculty of Radiological Technology
 Faculty of Medical Technology
 Faculty of Physical Therapy
 Faculty of Optometry
 Faculty of Science
 Faculty of Architecture
 Faculty of Art and Design
 Faculty of Digital Art*
 Faculty of Political Science *
 Faculty of Liberal Arts*
 Faculty of Law*
 Faculty of Education*
 Faculty of Business Administration
 Faculty of Accounting*
 Faculty of Economics
 Institute of Criminology 
 Institute of Diplomacy and International Studies 
 Institute of Public Administration

Reception 
Out of the over 300 universities and colleges in Thailand, 
Rangsit University is ranked by many independent academic rankings in the top 50. 
EduRank ranks the University at 1st in Pathum Thani, 18th in Thailand, and 3060th in the world in 2020. 
Webometric Ranking of World Universities puts the University at 20st in Thailand and 2448th in the world.

Rangsit University's song
This is the theme song of the institute of Rangsit University, used in various university activities:

 Rangsit University March (เพลงมาร์ชมหาวิทยาลัยรังสิต)
 Tawan Rung Rangsit (เพลงตะวันรุ่งทุ่งรังสิต)
 Blue Dream (เพลงฟ้าฝันบานเย็น)
 Mon Rangsit (เพลงมนต์รังสิต)
 Sri Rangsit (เพลงศรีรังสิต)
 Rangsit Love (เพลงรักรังสิต)
 RSU Blue Fuchsia (เพลง RSU บลูบานเย็น)
 Goodbye, goodbye evening (เพลงลาแล้วลาบานเย็นฟ้า)
 United in Architecture (เพลงรวมใจสถาปัตย์)
 Panithan, Rangsit Nurse (เพลงปณิธาน พยาบาลรังสิต)
 Communication Arts's Theme (เพลงนิเทศศาสตร์)
 Chalermnam Rangsit Graduate School (เพลงเฉลิมนามรังสิต บัณฑิตสถาน)

Other 
It is another song used in various university activities.
 You are Raise Up
 Peng Neung (Song of "The Sun Games 2020" event hosted by Rangsit University)
 RSU FC (Football club's song of Rangsit University)
 Shall We Dance?

References

External links 
Rangsit University International College (RIC)
Rangsit University International Programs (RSUip)
Rangsit University Consultant in Vietnam(RSUip)

 
Private universities and colleges in Thailand
Buildings and structures in Pathum Thani province
Educational institutions established in 1986
1986 establishments in Thailand